David Stubbeman (August 28, 1938 – September 11, 2010) was an American politician who served in the Texas House of Representatives from the 62nd district from 1975 to 1979.

He died on September 11, 2010, in Abilene, Texas at age 72.

References

1938 births
2010 deaths
Democratic Party members of the Texas House of Representatives